The Zingara was a general cargo vessel that was wrecked in the Straits of Tiran in the Red Sea on 21 August 1984 and is now a recreational diving site.

See also

References

Wreck diving sites
Shipwrecks in the Red Sea
Maritime incidents in 1984
1963 ships
Ships built in Rostock
Ships built in East Germany